William McGuire, M.D. (born 1948) is an American healthcare executive best known for his tenure as chairman and chief executive officer of UnitedHealth Group from 1991 until his resignation in 2006, while under investigation for securities fraud, for which he would later settle out of court.  He also owns Minnesota United FC, Minnesota's professional soccer team.

Personal life 
McGuire was born in Troy, New York, and grew up in League City, Texas.  He attended college at the University of Texas at Austin and medical school at the University of Texas Medical Branch at Galveston, Texas.  After medical school, he worked in California and Colorado before moving to Minnesota.

UnitedHealth 
McGuire joined UnitedHealthcare in November 1988 as an executive vice president when the Peak Health Plan, of which he was then president and chief operating officer, was acquired by UnitedHealth Group.  In May 1989, he was appointed to the board of directors and became chief operating officer. In November 1989, he became president of the company, a position he held until May 1991.  He was named chief executive officer in February 1991, and chairman of the board of directors in May of the same year.

When McGuire joined UnitedHealth Group, it was an unprofitable regional health maintenance organization with annual revenues around $400 million.  When he left, UnitedHealth Group the company had more than $70 billion in annual revenues, more than 50,000 employees, and more than sixty million health plan members.

In 2006, the Securities and Exchange Commission began investigating the conduct of UnitedHealth's management and directors, including McGuire, as did the Internal Revenue Service and prosecutors in the United States Attorneys' office for the Southern District of New York.

The investigations came to light after a series of probing stories in the Wall Street Journal in May 2006, discussing the apparent "backdating" of stock options, in a then-common process called options backdating. Backdating involves manipulating the timing of options grants so they look as though they were made on days when the stock's value was lower. Doing that boosts recipients' windfall when they sell the stock.  The backdating was approved by the board of directors, according to the Journal. Several shareholder classes filed lawsuits accusing former UnitedHealth's directors of failing in their fiduciary duty to properly notify shareholders of the scheme.

On October 15, 2006, it was announced that McGuire would step down immediately as chairman and director of UnitedHealth.  McGuire remained as chief executive officer through December 1, and was succeeded by Stephen Hemsley (then president and chief operating officer, and a member of the board of directors). From 1989 until 2006, McGuire received compensation from UnitedHealth in the form of stock options that eventually became worth around $1.6 billion. However, in the course of the litigations that followed his departure from the company, McGuire was temporarily enjoined from exercising the options.  The injunction was later released in late 2008.

On December 6, 2007, the Securities and Exchange Commission announced a settlement, under which McGuire was to repay $468 million as a partial settlement of the backdating prosecution.  McGuire was fined $7 million and agreed to not serve as an officer or director of a public company for ten years.

Minnesota United FC 
In November 2012, Dr. McGuire purchased Minnesota Stars FC, a league-owned professional soccer team in Minnesota.  The team was rebranded as Minnesota United FC in March 2013.

Philanthropy 

In October 2009, Dr. McGuire and his wife Nadine donated a rare butterfly collection valued at $41 MM to the University of Florida.

In 2007, Dr. and Mrs. McGuire established the McGuire Scholar Program at the University of Minnesota, which provides scholarships to talented students from economically disadvantaged backgrounds.

In 2004, Dr. and Mrs. McGuire made a $10 MM gift to the Walker Art Center in Minneapolis, Minnesota.

In 2004, Dr. and Mrs. McGuire made a $7.5 MM gift to Amherst College in Amherst, Massachusetts. The college renamed its life sciences building in their honor.

In 2003, Dr. and Mrs. McGuire made a $10 MM gift to the Guthrie Theater in Minneapolis, Minnesota.

In December 2000, Dr. and Mrs. McGuire made a $4.2 MM gift to the University of Florida to construct and establish the McGuire Center for Lepidoptera Research and the McGuire Center for Insect Conservation.

References

External links
Forbes profile

Living people
1948 births
People from League City, Texas
American chief operating officers
American health care chief executives
Minnesota United FC
North American Soccer League executives
Members of the National Academy of Medicine